Fazilka district is one of Twenty Three districts in the state of Punjab in India. The district headquarters of the Fazilka District are at Fazilka.

History

On 27 July 2011, the Government of Punjab created two new districts: Fazilka district by the partition of Firozpur district, and Pathankot district by the partition of Gurdaspur district.

On January 29, 1970, Mrs. Gandhi announced the transfer of a part of Fazilka tehsil and Abohar to Haryana. The final transfer of Fazilka and Abohar was to take place by January 1975. The transfer to a neighboring State of Punjab's cotton-producing belt of Abohar and Falzika was not accepted. On January 25, the Mathew Commission said that Abohar and Fazilka tehsils of Punjab could not be transferred to Haryana because they were not contiguous with Haryana's border.

Location
It is located next to the border with Pakistan, the border being to its west. It has the district of Firozpur to its north, Sri Muktsar Sahib to its east and Sri Ganganagar to the south and Pakistan to its west.

Geography
It has an extreme climate, with the summers being very hot and the winters being very cold. The River Sutlej runs through the district and moves over to the Pakistan side through the Indo-Pakistani border.

Politics

Administration
The district's chief executive is the Deputy Commissioner. The office is held by Dr. Senu Duggal, IAS. 

The district is administratively subdivided into three tehsils:
 Fazilka
 Abohar
 Jalalabad

Demographics

According to the 2011 census, Fazilka district has a population of 1,027,143. Scheduled Castes made up 41.51% of the population.

Religion 
Hinduism and Sikhism are the main religions of the Fazilka district. The Arora community of Punjabi Hindus constitute a sizeable population in the district. With the migration of the non-Muslim population from Pakistan to India in 1947, they settled here in this region of Firozpur district.

In the Firozpur Religion Census 2011, 84.97% of the Fazilka tehsil of Firozpur district registered their religion as Hindu and 13.35% registered as Sikh.

Languages 

At the time of the 2011 census, 68.31% of the population spoke Punjabi, 21.55% Bagri and 9.12% Hindi as their first language.

Notes

References

External links 

 Official website

 
Districts of Punjab, India